Agave demeesteriana is a species reported as native to the Mexican states of Sinaloa and Veracruz and reportedly naturalized in Florida.

References

desmettiana
Endemic flora of Mexico
Flora of Sinaloa
Flora of Veracruz
Plants described in 1864